Studio Trieste is an album by trumpeter Chet Baker, guitarist Jim Hall and flautist Hubert Laws which was recorded in 1982 and released on the CTI label.

Reception 

The Allmusic review by Scott Yanow states: "Baker's CTI recordings (which were usually arranged by Don Sebesky) always came off well. For what would be his final CTI date, he was matched with guitarist Jim Hall, flutist Hubert Laws and a fine rhythm section ... Throughout, Sebesky's charts favorably showcase Baker's lyrical trumpet, making this a recommended LP that deserves to be reissued".

Track listing 
 "Malagueña" (Ernesto Lecuona) – 9:44
 "Django" (John Lewis) – 10:02
 "Swan Lake" (Pyotr Ilyich Tchaikovsky) – 8:42
 "All Blues" (Miles Davis) – 9:43

Personnel 
Chet Baker – trumpet, flugelhorn
Jim Hall – guitar
Hubert Laws – flute
Kenny Barron (tracks 1 & 4), Jorge Dalto (tracks 2 & 3) – keyboards
Jack Wilkins – guitar (track 4)
Gary King – electric bass (tracks 1 & 4)
George Mraz – bass (tracks 1 & 2)
Steve Gadd – drums
Sammy Figueroa – percussion
Don Sebesky – arranger

References 

Chet Baker albums
Jim Hall (musician) albums
Hubert Laws albums
1982 albums
CTI Records albums
Albums produced by Creed Taylor
Albums recorded at Van Gelder Studio
Albums arranged by Don Sebesky